The 2007 World Women's Curling Championship was held in Aomori, Aomori, Japan from March 17–25, 2007.  It was the first world curling championship (men's or women's) to be held in Asia. Team Canada skipped by Kelly Scott won 8-4 over Denmark's Angelina Jensen in gold medal final.

Teams

Round-robin standings

*First Appearance

Round-robin results

Draw 1
March 17, 10:00

Draw 2
March 17, 15:00

Draw 3
March 17, 20:00

Draw 4
March 18, 10:00

Draw 5
March 18, 15:00

Draw 6
March 18, 20:00

Draw 7
March 19, 10:00

Draw 8
March 19, 15:00

Draw 9
March 19, 20:00

Draw 10
March 20, 10:00

Draw 11
March 20, 15:00

Draw 12
March 20, 20:00

Draw 13
March 21, 10:00

Draw 14
March 21, 15:00

Draw 15
March 21, 20:00

Draw 16
March 22, 10:00

Draw 17
March 22, 15:00

Playoffs

1 vs. 2 game
March 24, 15:00
{{ Curlingbox
| sheet = B
| team1 =  (Jensen)
| 0|1|0|0|0|1|0|1|X|X| |3
| team2 =  (Scott)' 
| 1|0|2|2|1|0|5|0|X|X| |11
}}

3 vs. 4 gameMarch 24, 20:00SemifinalMarch 24, 20:00Gold-medal gameMarch 25, 14:00''

Player percentages

References

External links
 
 

World Women's Curling Championship, 2007
World Women's Curling Championship
World Women's Curling Championship
Sport in Aomori (city)
International curling competitions hosted by Japan
Women's curling competitions in Japan
March 2007 sports events in Asia
Sports competitions in Aomori Prefecture